Jairo Alonso Neira Cortez (born 9 December 1986) is a Chilean former footballer who played as a midfielder.

Career
Neira began his career with Universidad de Concepción in 2005. 

After suffering an injury when he was a player of Fernández Vial, he emigrated to Paraguay and played for Deportivo 31 de Julio from Misiones and Silvio Pettirossi. 

His last club was Curicó Unido in the 2009 season.

References

External links
 
 

1986 births
Living people
People from Arauco Province
Chilean footballers
Chilean expatriate footballers
Universidad de Concepción footballers
C.D. Arturo Fernández Vial footballers
Silvio Pettirossi footballers
Curicó Unido footballers
Chilean Primera División players
Primera B de Chile players
Paraguayan Primera División players
Chilean expatriate sportspeople in Paraguay
Expatriate footballers in Paraguay
Association football midfielders